The 1973 Paris–Roubaix was the 71st edition of the Paris–Roubaix cycle race and was held on 15 April 1973. The race started in Compiègne and finished in Roubaix. The race was won by Eddy Merckx of the Molteni team.

General classification

References

Paris–Roubaix
Paris-Roubaix
Paris-Roubaix
Paris-Roubaix
Paris-Roubaix